Gerry Heaney (born 1945) is a Scottish former professional footballer who played as a full back. After playing youth football with Hamilton Academical, Heaney played in the Scottish league for Third Lanark, and in the North American Soccer League for the Vancouver Whitecaps.

During the 1966–67 season, Heaney combined his football career at Third Lanark with a teaching post at Jordanhill College in Glasgow and then Holy Cross High School in Hamilton.

References

1945 births
Living people
Scottish footballers
Scottish expatriate footballers
Hamilton Academical F.C. players
Third Lanark A.C. players
Vancouver Whitecaps (1974–1984) players
Scottish Football League players
North American Soccer League (1968–1984) players
North American Soccer League (1968–1984) indoor players
Scottish expatriate sportspeople in Canada
Expatriate soccer players in Canada
Association football defenders
Scottish educators